Siôn Bradford (1706–1785) was a Welsh language poet, from Betws, Tir Iarll, Glamorgan, in south Wales.

Although a minor poet himself he is important as the poetic teacher of Edward Williams (Iolo Morganwg), and collaborated with him in his sometimes extravagant antiquarian researches.

References
. 

Welsh-language poets
1706 births
1785 deaths